Peter Everett is an Australian television host. He is probably best known for hosting the Australian adaptation of cook show Ready Steady Cook, which aired on Network Ten. He is known for appearing on Changing Rooms which aired on the Nine Network in the late 1990s. He has also taken part in two reality television competition series: Skating on Thin Ice in 2005 and The Celebrity Apprentice Australia in 2013.

Early life
Everett was born in Charleville, Queensland. He moved to Brisbane in his adolescence. Everett has lived in the United States and Hong Kong. He then moved to Sydney to run the Queen Street Brasserie.

Career

Early career (1998–2005)
In 1998, Everett worked as an interior designer on the Australian adaptation of Changing Rooms. He co-hosted Renovation Rescue, and hosted Amazing Homes. He also took part in reality figure skating series Skating on Thin Ice in 2005.

Ready Steady Cook (2006–2011)

In 2006 Everett replaced Nick Stratford as host of the Australian adaptation of Ready Steady Cook, a cooking game show with a similar format to that of the original British program. It features two teams, each with a chef and a guest, competing to prepare meals from given ingredients. Everett opens each show and poses questions to teams about the meal's preparation. The show premiered on Network Ten in 2005.

In June 2011 Everett left Ready Steady Cook; he was replaced by comedian Colin Lane.

Post-2011 career
After having a year off being on television in 2012, Everett competed on season 3 of The Celebrity Apprentice Australia on the Nine Network in 2013.

References

External links
 Up Close and Personal with Peter Everett

Living people
Australian interior designers
Australian television presenters
People from South West Queensland
The Apprentice Australia candidates
Year of birth missing (living people)